Events from the year 1879 in the United States.

Incumbents

Federal Government 
 President: Rutherford B. Hayes (R-Ohio)
 Vice President: William A. Wheeler (R-New York)
 Chief Justice: Morrison Waite (Ohio)
 Speaker of the House of Representatives: Samuel J. Randall (D-Pennsylvania)
 Congress: 45th (until March 4), 46th (starting March 4)

Events

 January – The constitution of California is ratified.
 January 1 – The Specie Resumption Act takes effect: the Greenback is valued the same as gold for the first time since the American Civil War.
 February 12 – At New York City's Madison Square Garden, the first artificial ice rink in North America opens.
 February 15 – Women's rights: American President Rutherford B. Hayes signs a bill allowing female attorneys to argue cases before the Supreme Court of the United States.
 February 22 – In Utica, New York, Frank Woolworth opens the first of many of 5 and 10-cent Woolworth stores.
 March 3 – The United States Geological Survey is created.
 April 8 – Milk sold in glass bottles for the first time.
 April 12 – Mary Baker Eddy founds the Church of Christ, Scientist in Boston.
 May 10 – 
 The Archaeological Institute of America (AIA) is formed.
 Completion of the first Transcontinental Railroad at Promontory Summit, Utah, where the Central Pacific Railroad and the Union Pacific Railroad rails met on May 10, 1869.
 Meteorite falls near Estherville, Iowa.
 May 30 –  New York City's Gilmore's Garden is renamed Madison Square Garden after 4th President James Madison by William Henry Vanderbilt, and is opened to the public at 26th Street and Madison Avenue.
 June 21 – Infielder William White plays in one game for the Providence Grays and in conjecture becomes the first African American to play MLB.
 July 1 – Christian Restorationist Charles Taze Russell publishes the first issue of the monthly Zion's Watch Tower and Herald of Christ's Presence which, as The Watchtower, will become the most widely circulated magazine in the world.
 July 8 – The ill-fated U.S. Jeannette Expedition departs San Francisco in an attempt to reach the North Pole by pioneering a route through the Bering Strait.
 July 19 – Doc Holliday kills for the first time after a man shoots up Holliday's New Mexico saloon.
 September – Henry George self-publishes his major work Progress and Poverty.
 September 25 – Deadwood, South Dakota fire: 2000 people are left homeless and 300 buildings destroyed; total loss of property is estimated at $3 million.
 September 29 – Meeker Massacre: Nathan Meeker and others are killed in an uprising at the White River Ute Indian Reservation in Colorado.
 October 22 – Using a filament of carbonized thread, Thomas Edison tests the first practical electric light bulb (it lasts 13½ hours before burning out).
 November – Simmons College of Kentucky, a historically black school, is founded.
 December 31 – Thomas Edison demonstrates incandescent lighting to the public for the first time  in Menlo Park, New Jersey.
 Undated – Laton Alton Huffman photographs Native American woman Pretty Nose.

Ongoing
 Gilded Age (1869–c. 1896)
 Depression of 1873–79 (1873–1879)

Sport 
September 26 – The Providence Grays defeat the Boston Red Caps 7–6 to clinch their First National League pennant

Births
 January 3 – Grace Coolidge, First Lady of the United States and Second Lady of the United States as wife of Calvin Coolidge (died 1957)
 January 12
 Ray Harroun, race car driver (died 1968)
 Calbraith Perry Rodgers, pioneer aviator, makes first transcontinental U.S. flight (died 1912 in aviation accident)
 January 13 – Melvin Jones, founder of Lions Clubs International (died 1961)
 January 20 – Ruth St. Denis, dancer (died 1968)
 February 3 – Guy Gillette, U.S. Senator from Iowa from 1936 to 1945 (died 1973)
 February 12 – George McGill, U.S. Senator from Kansas from 1930 to 1939 (died 1963)
 February 17 – Dorothy Canfield Fisher, activist and novelist (died 1958)
 March 6 – William P. Cronan, 19th Naval Governor of Guam (died 1929)
 March 18 – Emma Carus, opera singer (died 1927)
 March 27 – Edward Steichen, photographer, painter and curator (died 1973)
 April 1 – Louise Gunning, vaudeville singer (died 1960)
 April 9 – Thomas Meighan, film actor (died 1936)
 April 14 – James Branch Cabell, novelist (died 1958)
 April 24 – Oris Paxton Van Sweringen, financier (died 1936)
 May 3 – Clyde L. Herring, U.S. Senator from Iowa from 1937 to 1943 (died 1945)
 May 12
 George Landenberger, U.S. Navy captain and 23rd Governor of American Samoa (died 1936)
 Georgia Ann Robinson, community worker, first African American woman to be appointed a Los Angeles police officer (died 1961)
 May 19
 Nancy Astor, née Langhorne, American-born British politician (died 1964 in the United Kingdom)
 Waldorf Astor, American-born British politician and newspaper proprietor (died 1952 in the United Kingdom)
 May 22 – Eastwood Lane, composer (died 1951)
 June 3 – Raymond Pearl, biologist (died 1940)
 June 13 – Lois Weber, film director and screenwriter (died 1939)
 June 21 – Henry Creamer, songwriter (died 1930)
 July 1
 Nicky Arnstein, professional gambler and con artist, married to Fanny Brice (died 1965)
 H. Craig Severance, architect (died 1941)
 July 10 – Charles P. Snyder, admiral (died 1964)
 July 28 – Lucy Burns, women's rights campaigner (died 1966)
 August 2 – James M. Tunnell, U.S. Senator from Delaware from 1941 to 1947 (died 1957)
 August 8 – Wesley Newcomb Hohfeld, professor of jurisprudence (died 1918)
 August 15 – Ethel Barrymore, actress (died 1959)
 August 20 – Ralph Budd, railroad president (died 1962)
 August 27 – Otis F. Glenn, U.S. Senator from Illinois from 1928 to 1933 (died 1959)
 August 28 – Sydney Ayres, silent film actor (died 1916)
 September 13 – James Larkin Pearson, poet and newspaper publisher, North Carolina Poet Laureate from 1953 to 1981 (died 1981)
 September 14 – Margaret Sanger, birth control advocate (died 1966)
 September 19 – Louis Joseph Vance, novelist (died 1933)
 October 2 – Wallace Stevens, poet (died 1955)
 October 5 – Francis Peyton Rous, pathologist, recipient of the Nobel Prize in Physiology or Medicine in 1966 (died 1970)
 October 12 – Chris Smith, African American vaudeville composer and performer (died 1949)
 October 15 – Jane Darwell, née Patti Woodard, actress (died 1967)
 October 21 – Eugene Burton Ely, pioneer aviator (died 1911 in aviation accident)
 November 2 – Marion Jones Farquhar, tennis player (died 1965)
 November 4 – Will Rogers, humorist (died 1935)
 November 5 – Hannah J. Patterson, suffragist and social activist (died 1937)
 November 10 – Vachel Lindsay, poet (died 1931)
 November 15 – Lewis Stone, actor, known for playing Judge Hardy (died 1953)
 November 26 – Charles Goddard, playwright and screenwriter (died 1951)
 November 28 – Guy V. Howard, U.S. Senator from Minnesota from 1936 to 1937 (died 1954)
 December 1 – Beth Slater Whitson, lyricist (died 1930)
 December 4 – Richard Von Albade Gammon, University of Georgia football fullback (died 1897)
 December 5 – Clyde Cessna, aviator, aircraft designer and manufacturer (died 1954)
 December 10 – Jouett Shouse, politician (died 1968)
 December 12 – Laura Hope Crews, actress (died 1942)
 December 15 – Bert H. Miller, U.S. Senator from Idaho in 1949 (died 1949)
 December 20 – Earle Ovington, aviator, flew first experimental airmail (died 1936)
 December 25 – Grace George, actress (died 1961)
 December 26 – Christie Benet, U.S. Senator from South Carolina in 1918 (died 1951)
 December 28 – Billy Mitchell, general, military aviation pioneer (died 1936)
 Gurdon Chapell

Deaths
 February 2 – Richard Henry Dana Sr., poet, critic and lawyer (born 1787)
 March 2
 John Eberhard Faber, pencil manufacturer (born 1822 in Germany)
 Wade Keyes, Acting Confederate States Attorney General in 1861 and 1863–1864 (born 1821)
 March 16 – George Goldthwaite, U.S. Senator from Alabama from 1871 to 1877 (born 1809)
 April 12 – Richard Taylor, Confederate general (born 1826)
 April 30 – Sarah Josepha Hale, writer (born 1788)
 May 24 – William Lloyd Garrison, abolitionist (born 1805)
 June 1
 James Shields, U.S. Senator from Illinois from 1849 to 1855, from Minnesota from 1858 to 1859 and from Missouri in 1879 (born 1810 in Ireland)
 Louisa Caroline Huggins Tuthill, children's writer (born 1799)
 June 26 – Richard H. Anderson, United States Army officer during the Mexican–American War, Confederate general during the American Civil War (born 1821)
 July 4 – Sarah Dorsey, novelist and historian (born 1829)
 July 7 – George Caleb Bingham, realist painter (born 1811)
 July 11 – William Allen, U.S. Senator from Ohio from 1837 to 1849 (born 1803)
 July 16 – Frederick Langenheim, pioneer of panoramic photography (born 1809 in Germany)
 July 26 – Robert Ward Johnson, U.S. Senator from Arkansas from 1862 to 1865 (born 1814)
 August 30 – John Bell Hood, Confederate general (born 1831)
 September 8 – William Morris Hunt, painter (born 1824)
 September 30 – Francis Gillette, U.S. Senator from Connecticut from 1854 to 1855 (born 1807)
 October 11 – Ethel Lynn Beers, poet (born 1827)
 October 13 – Henry Charles Carey, economist (born 1793)
 October 31
 Jacob Abbott, children's writer (born 1803)
 Joseph Hooker, Union Army general during the American Civil War (born 1814)
 November 1 – Zachariah Chandler, U.S. Senator from Michigan from 1857 to 1875 and in 1879 (born 1813)
 December 31 – George S. Houston, Governor of Alabama from 1874 to 1878 and U.S. Senator from Alabama in 1879 (born 1811)

See also
Timeline of United States history (1860–1899)

References

External links
 

 
1870s in the United States
United States
United States
Years of the 19th century in the United States